Mustafa Kamal Pasha is a Bangladesh Nationalist Party politician and a former member of parliament for Chittagong-3 and Chittagong-16.

Career
Pasha was elected to parliament from Chittagong-16 as a Bangladesh Nationalist Party candidate in 2008. He was elected to parliament from Chittagong-3 as a Bangladesh Nationalist Party candidate in 2001.

Pasha's son was shot and his house was set on fire during clashes between Bangladesh Awami League and Bangladesh Nationalist Party activists on 24 November 2013.

References

Bangladesh Nationalist Party politicians
Living people
6th Jatiya Sangsad members
8th Jatiya Sangsad members
9th Jatiya Sangsad members
1950 births
People from Sandwip Upazila